Cavett is an unincorporated community in Van Wert County, in the U.S. state of Ohio.

History
A post office called Cavett was established in 1881, and remained in operation until 1918. Cavett was the name of a local family of pioneer settlers.

References

Unincorporated communities in Van Wert County, Ohio
Unincorporated communities in Ohio
1881 establishments in Ohio
Populated places established in 1881